Serizjan-e Namdi (also Romanized as Serīzjān-e Namdī; also known as Serīzjān) is a village in Khvajehei Rural District, Meymand District, Firuzabad County, Fars Province, Iran. At the 2006 census, its population was 153, in 32 families.

References 

Populated places in Firuzabad County